The annual Walkley Awards are presented in Australia to recognise and reward excellence in journalism. They cover all media including print, television, documentary, radio, photographic and online media. The Gold Walkley is the highest prize and is chosen from all category winners. The awards are under the administration of the Walkley Foundation for Journalism.

The Nikon Photography Prizes are also awarded by the Walkley Foundation at the awards ceremony, on behalf of Nikon.

History
The awards were instituted in five categories in 1956 by businessman Sir William Walkley, founder of Ampol. After his death, the awards were handled by the Australian Journalists' Association which, in 1992, was merged into the Media, Entertainment & Arts Alliance. In 2000, the alliance voted to establish the Walkley Foundation. In that same year, the Walkley Awards were merged with the Nikon Press Photographer of the Year Awards.

The 2015 ceremony was held on 3 December at Crown Casino in Melbourne and was broadcast through an online live stream as well as on A-PAC. In 2016, the event moved to the Brisbane Convention & Exhibition Centre.

Awards
Excluding the non-fiction book award, only work published by Australian-based media organisations is eligible for an award. Entries are initially evaluated by a jury on newsworthiness, research, writing, production, incisiveness, impact, public benefit, ethics, originality, innovation and creative flair — or other relevant criteria in respect of graphics and electronic media. The jury shortlists three entrants to the Walkley Advisory Board, who select the best entrant in each category, as well as the winner of the "Press Photographer of the Year", "Journalism Leadership Award" and the "Gold Walkley" awards.

Finalists are chosen by an independent board of eminent journalists and photographers. The awards cover all media including print, television, radio, photographic and online media. They can be regarded as the Australian equivalent of the Pulitzer Prize.

The Gold Walkley is the major award, being chosen from all category winners.

The awards have been archived by the Pandora Archive since 2002.

The finalists are formally announced in October each year and the awards are presented at a formal ceremony in late November or early December.

Categories
, awards are given in the following categories:

Major categories
 Gold Walkley
 Outstanding Contribution to Journalism
 Nikon-Walkley Australian Press Photographer of the Year

Longform journalism
Walkley Book Award
Walkley Documentary Award

Print/text journalism
 News Report
 Feature writing short (under 4,000 words)
 Feature writing long (over 4,000 words)

Photography
 News Photography
 Sport Photography
 Feature/Photographic Essay

Nikon Photography Prizes
These are not Walkley Awards, but administered by the Walkley Foundation on behalf of Nikon.
Photo of the Year
Portrait Prize
Community/Regional Prize
Contemporary Australian Daily Life Prize

Radio/audio journalism
News and Current Affairs
Audio Feature

Television/Video journalism

News Reporting
Current Affairs Short (less than 20 minutes)
Current Affairs Long (more than 20 minutes)
Camerawork

All media
Innovation
Coverage of a Major News Event or Issue
Scoop of the Year
Business Journalism
Coverage of Community & Regional Affairs
Investigative Journalism
Coverage of Indigenous Affairs
Sports Journalism
Public Service Journalism
Commentary, Analysis, Opinion and Critique
Headline, Caption or Hook
Production
Cartoon

Historical categories

 Journalism Leadership (1997–2017)
Broadcast Interviewing (1997–2017?) - various name changes, most recently Interviewing.
 Three Headings
 Newspaper Feature Writing
 Magazine Feature Writing
 Artwork
 Daily Life Photography
 Editorial Graphics and Design
 Best Use of Medium
 Coverage of Suburban or Regional Affairs
 International Journalism
 Coverage of Asia-Pacific Region
 Coverage of Sport
 Social Equity Journalism
 Commentary, Analysis, Opinion and Critique|Commentary, Analysis, Opinion and Critique

See also
 List of journalism awards
 Prizes named after people

References

External links

Australian literary awards
Australian journalism awards
Awards established in 1956
1956 establishments in Australia